Gustav Friedrich Carl Johann Sthamer (24 November 1856 – 29 June 1931) was a German lawyer, First Mayor of Hamburg, and ambassador.

Sthamer was born on 24 November 1856 in Groß Weeden, part of the municipality Rondeshagen. He studied law at the universities of Heidelberg, Leipzig, and Göttingen. In 1879, Sthamer became a lawyer in Hamburg, and in 1892, chairman of Hamburg's bar association. 1901–1904, Sthamer was member of the Hamburg Parliament, and elected to the Senate of Hamburg in 1904. During the First World War, Sthamer was president of the civil government of the occupied Antwerp.

In 1919, Sthamer was elected to the Senate of Hamburg and became First Mayor of Hamburg in 1920. After a short term in office, Sthamer resigned because he was appointed as German ambassador to the United Kingdom.

Sthamer died on 29 June 1931.

References

External links 
 
 

1856 births
1931 deaths
People from Herzogtum Lauenburg
Ambassadors of Germany to the United Kingdom
Mayors of Hamburg
Members of the Hamburg Parliament
Senators of Hamburg (before 1919)
Senators of Hamburg
University of Göttingen alumni
Heidelberg University alumni
Leipzig University alumni